St. Maurice School is a private school in Winnipeg, Manitoba, Canada. It is the largest Catholic school in Manitoba with an enrollment of seven hundred students from Kindergarten to Grade 12.

History
St. Maurice was founded in 1958 by Maurice Cournoyer and the Sisters of Sion, and was officially opened on September 28, 1958. However, due to declining student population, the school was closed in June 1970.

St. Maurice School was reopened and incorporated on September 4, 1979, with the support of St. Vital Roman Catholic Church.

References

External links
 St. Maurice School Official Website

Elementary schools in Winnipeg
High schools in Winnipeg
Private schools in Manitoba
Catholic elementary schools in Manitoba
Catholic secondary schools in Manitoba
Educational institutions established in 1958
1958 establishments in Manitoba

Fort Garry, Winnipeg